In linguistic typology, time–manner–place is a sentence structure that defines the order of adpositional phrases and adverbs in a sentence: "yesterday", "by car", "to the store". Japanese, Afrikaans, Dutch, Mandarin, and German use this structure.

An example of this appositional ordering in German is:

The temporal phrase –  (when? – "today") – comes first, the manner –  (how? – "by car") – is second, and the place –  (where? – "to Munich") – is third.

See also
 Syntax
Adverb

References

Grammar
Syntactic relationships
Syntax